The King Bees was an American New York-based rhythm and blues musical group of the 1960s. The Kingbees were formed around 1964.

The King Bees were Danny Kortchmar (credited as Danny Kootch) (guitar), Joel O'Brien (drums), Dickie Frank (bass) and John McDuffy (vocals and organ). They released three singles on RCA Records.

After the group disbanded, Kortchmar and O'Brien met again in the Flying Machine, fronted by then-unknown James Taylor, and were later to reunite in Jo Mama. In 2003, after O'Brien's death, they had a memorial where Kortchmar and Frank played.

Discography
 1965: "That Ain't Love" / "What She Does To Me"
 1966: "Rhythm And Blues" / "On Your Way Down To Drain"
 1966: "Lost In The Shuffle" / "Hardly - Part III"

The band is not to be confused with the 1980's rockabilly, power pop, and New Wave band of the same name.

References

American rhythm and blues musical groups
Musical groups from New York City
RSO Records artists